Plainfield High School may refer to:

Plainfield High School (Connecticut)
Plainfield High School (Illinois)
Plainfield South High School — Plainfield, Illinois
Plainfield High School (Indiana)
Nashua-Plainfield High School — Nashua, Iowa
Plainfield High School (New Jersey) — Plainfield, New Jersey
North Plainfield High School — North Plainfield, New Jersey
South Plainfield High School — South Plainfield, New Jersey

See also
[[*Plainfield Academy (disambiguation)